The Olsen Gang Over the Hill is a 1981 Danish comedy film directed by Erik Balling and starring Ove Sprogøe.

Cast
 Ove Sprogøe as Egon Olsen
 Morten Grunwald as Benny Frandsen
 Poul Bundgaard as Kjeld Jensen
 Kirsten Walther as Yvonne Jensen
 Axel Strøbye as Kriminalassistent Jensen
 Ole Ernst as Politiassistent Holm
 Bjørn Watt-Boolsen as Bang-Johansen
 Holger Juul Hansen as Hallandsen
 Ove Verner Hansen as Bøffen
Additionally, Poul Reichhardt portrays a Harbour Guard, Dick Kaysø portrays a Crane Operator, Claus Ryskjær portrays a Bodyguard leader, Søren Steen portrays another Bodyguard, Kai Løvring portrays a Cleaner, while Holger Perfort and Bertel Lauring portrays Carlsberg workers.

References

External links

1981 films
1981 comedy films
1980s Danish-language films
Films directed by Erik Balling
Films with screenplays by Erik Balling
Olsen-banden films